William Martin Beauchamp (March 25, 1830 – 1925) was an American ethnologist and Episcopal clergyman. He published several works on the archeology and ethnology of the Haudenosaunee (Iroquois) in New York.

Early life and education
Beauchamp was born in Coldenham, Orange County, New York. He received his education at Skaneateles Academy until 1845. He graduated from the DeLancey Divinity School, and received a degree of Doctor of Sacred Theology (S.T.D. Sacrae Theologiae Doctor) in 1886 from Hobart College. He married Sarah Carter of Ravenna, Ohio in November 1857 and resided in Syracuse, New York. His sister, Mary Elizabeth Beauchamp, was an educator and author.

Career
From 1865 to 1900, Beauchamp was rector of Grace Episcopal Church in Baldwinsville, N. Y. From 1884 to 1912 he was examining chaplain for the diocese of New York and from 1884-1910 he was archaeologist of New York State Museum. In 1894 Beauchamp was the first to seriously question the authenticity of the Pompey stone and prove that it was carved as a hoax.

In addition, he made valuable archæological contributions from his independent research, particularly concerning the Iroquois Indians. In 1889 the Bureau of American Ethnology commissioned him to survey the Iroquois territory in New York and Canada, and to prepare a map indicating the location of all the known Indian sites in that region. An enlargement of this map was published in Beauchamp's Aboriginal Occupation of New York (1900). His other works are: 
 
The Iroquois Trail (1892)
Indian Names in New York (1893)
Shells of Onondaga County (1896)
History of the New York Iroquois, now Commonly Called the Six Nations (1905)
Aboriginal Use of Wood in New York (1905)
Aboriginal Place Names of New York (1907)
Past and Present of Syracuse and Onondaga County (1908)
Iroquois Folk Lore, Gathered From the Six Nations of New York (1922)

Member of organizations
 American Folklore Society
 Onondaga Historical Association (1909-1910)
 A.A.A.S.

References

External links

 
  "William Martin Beauchamp", Minnesota State University-Mankato eMuseum
 Portrait by John Dodgson Barrow

1830 births
1925 deaths
19th-century American Episcopal priests
19th-century American writers
20th-century American non-fiction writers
20th-century American Episcopal priests
People from Montgomery, New York
People from Baldwinsville, New York
American archaeologists
American ethnologists
Historians from New York (state)